Viscount   was the 16th (and final) daimyō of Kurobane Domain in Shimotsuke Province, Japan (modern-day Tochigi Prefecture) under the Bakumatsu period Tokugawa shogunate. His courtesy title was Mimasaka-no-kami, and his Court rank was Junior Fifth Rank, Lower Grade, later raised to Upper Third Rank.

Biography
Ōzeki Masutoshi was the son of Tani Morishige, the daimyō of Yamaga Domain in Tanba Province, although some accounts state that he was the third son of Matsudaira Yorihisa of Hitachi-Fuchū Domain.  In any event, he was posthumously adopted in 1868 to succeed Ōzeki Masuhiro, the 15th daimyō of Kurobane who had died without heir. In the Boshin War, he immediate pledged fealty to the new Meiji government and was awarded with reconfirmation in his holdings of 15,000 koku. In 1869 he was appointed imperial governor of Kurobane. With the abolition of the han system in July 1871, he retired and relocated to Tokyo. In February 1872, he went to the United States for studies, returning to Japan the following year.

With the establishment of the kazoku peerage system he was awarded with the title of shishaku (viscount) in 1884. In 1885, he was awarded the Order of the Rising Sun, 4th class. He was awarded the Order of the Sacred Treasures, 3rd class on his death in 1905.

See also
Kurobane Domain

References 
 Koyasu Nobushige (1880). Buke kazoku meiyoden 武家家族名誉伝 Volume 1. Tokyo: Koyasu Nobushige. (Accessed from National Diet Library, 17 July 2008)

Tozama daimyo
1849 births
1905 deaths
People of the Boshin War
People of Meiji-period Japan
Kazoku
Recipients of the Order of the Sacred Treasure
Recipients of the Order of the Rising Sun